Sylhet Engineering College (SEC) is a public undergraduate (B.Sc. Engineering) College, established in 2007. It is affiliated with the "Shahjalal University of Science and Technology". "Sylhet Engineering College commonly known as SEC is a public Engineering College in Bangladesh, which focuses on the study of engineering. Every year, around 180 students get accepted to their undergraduate programs to study engineering.

Introduction 

Sylhet Engineering College (SEC) established in the year 2007 under the School of Applied Sciences & Technology, Shahjalal University of Science and Technology.

Campus
The Sylhet Engineering College (SEC) campus is located at Tilagarh, approximately six kilometers away from the heart of Sylhet city. Wifi connections exists everywhere in the campus. There are 16 multi-storied buildings included three large academic buildings, library and computer building, administrative building, the principal's residence, teachers and staff quarters. There are two male hostels and a female hostel for students.

Departments

The following departments offer 4 years B.Sc. (Engineering) degree every year:
 Department of Computer Science and Engineering (CSE)
 Department of Electrical and Electronic Engineering (EEE)
 Department of Civil Engineering (CE)

Undergraduate courses

Admission process
Students who have passed the SSC and HSC from Science background can apply for admission if they fulfill the minimum requirement. Admission into SEC is highly competitive and needs a high academic attainment at the SSC and HSC level. Selection of the students for admission is made through a written admission test. Academic activities are completed with four year semester credit system.

Grading system
The academic year consists of two semesters. Academic courses are based on credit system. The grading system:

Student scores overall CGPA above 3.75 is awarded distinction.

Campus life
Classes are held every day from 8 am to 5 pm without weekly holidays (Thursday & Friday). All academic activities are maintained by administrative office. Educational tour is. organized for the students every year. Various cultural activities and special days are celebrated in this campus. e.g. International Mother language day, Independence day, Victory day and Pohela Baishakh.

Scholarships opportunities 
In every semester government would give 1950 taka per students for basis in CGPA (Top 60% in per batch or department). After completing graduation, there is a scope to study abroad with scholarship which is counted by the rank of the Shahjalal University of Science & Technology. As a new Engineering College, SECian students got the opportunity to study in world's famous engineering university as like the University of Texas, National University of Singapore, University of Tartu, Florida Institute of Technology, University of Greenwich, Frankfurt University of Applied Sciences, TU Dresden with full scholarships. Not only these universities but also other university too.

Hall facility 
The hall facility of Sylhet Engineering College is well known. There are three residential halls (five stories hall each). Two halls for boys & one hall for ladies. These are listed below with their capacities:

Campus Radio
Campus radio was started by the student of first batch of Computer Science & Engineering  From 2015 as the department of Electrical and Electronic Engineering initiated their journey. Now it is maintained by both CSE & EEE.

Lab Facilities 
Sylhet Engineering College has sufficient instruments in its lab which is modern, updated and well equipped. Here students are getting the benefits of the following lab.

Department of Computer Science and Engineering(CSE) 
 Networking Lab
 Communication & Microprocessor Lab
 Central Computer Center Lab
 Computer Lab
 Microprocessor Lab
 Software Lab
 ACM Lab
 Digital Logic Design Lab
 ATTS Lab

Department of Electrical and Electronic Engineering (EEE) 
 Electronics Lab
 Electrical Circuit Lab
 Electrical Machine Lab
 Power System & High voltage Lab
 Digital Signal Processing Lab
 Structural Machine Lab
 Robotics Lab
 ATTS Lab

Department of Civil Engineering (CE) 
 Transportation Lab
 Drawing Lab
 Hydraulics Lab
 Environment Lab
 Geo-Technical Lab
 Physics Lab
 Chemistry Lab
 Machine Shop
 Welding Shop
 Surveying Shop
 Foundry Shop
 Wood Shop
 Language Lab
 AutoCAD Lab

Central Library
Central library is situated besides academic building. Library has a huge amount of books. you don't need to buy any books because you can get free books from library. The building also contains ACM Lab and free WiFi service. Yes you can get High Speed internet service for free in here. So the world of knowledge is open for you. The contents of the central library are updated consistently to keep up with technological trends.

Student organizations 
 Swaroborno Cultural Organization
 SEC CSE Society
 SEC Programming Club
 Rangbazz
 SEC Debate Society
 Ahoban(Campus Band)
 SECPA
 SEC Cyclist
 SEC Robotics Club
 SEC Gamers Community
 SEC Android Developers
SEC Blood Bank
SEC Mathematics Society
Hult Prize at SEC

References

External links 

 http://sec.ac.bd

Colleges in Sylhet District
Educational institutions established in 2007
Engineering universities and colleges in Bangladesh
2007 establishments in Bangladesh